Igavere may refer to several places in Estonia:

Igavere, Harju County, village in Raasiku Parish, Harju County
Igavere, Tartu County, village in Tartu Parish, Tartu County